Alumni Baseball Diamond is a baseball stadium in Fairfield, Connecticut. It opened in 1951 and is currently the home field of the Fairfield Stags baseball team representing Fairfield University.  

Former Major League Baseball player Keefe Cato of the Cincinnati Reds pitched on Alumni Baseball Diamond for the Fairfield Stags from 1976 to 1979 where he set 11 all-time program records.

Alumni Baseball Diamond also was the home field of the Fairfield Stallions of the New England Collegiate Baseball League during the inaugural 1994 NECBL season.  Major League Baseball player Joe Nathan of the Minnesota Twins pitched on Alumni Baseball Diamond for the Fairfield Stallions in 1994.

The field dimensions are 330 feet down the lines, 400 feet to center field and 370 feet in the power alleys. The facility includes batting cages and bullpens for both teams.

See also
 List of NCAA Division I baseball venues

References

External links
Fairfield Stags baseball
Digital Ballparks Photo Tour of Alumni Baseball Diamond

College baseball venues in the United States
Fairfield Stags baseball
Baseball venues in Connecticut
Sports venues in Fairfield County, Connecticut